Kristoffer Fagercrantz (born 9 October 1986) is a retired Swedish footballer who played as a midfielder.

Career 
Starting his career in IF Centern he moved to Halmstads BK in 2004, at the age of 17, he spent only 1 year with the youth team and in 2005 he played his first match in Allsvenskan.  In February 2006 he damaged the Meniscus, however the operation went well. During the autumn of 2006 he was loan to Laholms FK and in 2007 he went on loan to Falkenbergs FF which he was later sold to for an undisclosed fee. Fagercrantz stayed with Falkenberg until the end of the 2009 season when he decided he wanted to move forward with his career and signed for league rivals Jönköpings Södra. His time in Jönköping didn't go unnoticed and he attracted the attention of Kalmar FF and after the end of the 2010 season he left Jönköping for Kalmar, however limited playing time in Kalmar made both the club and Fagercrantz look for suitable options and in August 2012 he was loaned back to Halmstads BK.

References

External links 
 Kristoffer Fagercrantz at Halmstads BK 
 
  (archive)
 
 Kristoffer Fagercrantz at Footballdatabase

1986 births
Living people
Swedish footballers
Association football midfielders
Allsvenskan players
Halmstads BK players
Falkenbergs FF players
Jönköpings Södra IF players
Kalmar FF players